Blackstone station was a railroad station in Blackstone, Massachusetts. Opened in 1847, it was a stop for Providence–Worcester service until 1960, and Boston commuter service until 1966.

History
The Providence and Worcester Railroad (P&W) opened on the alignment of the former Blackstone Canal in October 1847. In 1850, the Boston and New York Central Railroad (B&NYC) completed the Southbridge and Blackstone Railroad between Blackstone and Mechanicsville, Connecticut on the Norwich and Worcester Railroad. That line was infrequently operated until 1867, when the Boston, Hartford and Erie Railroad (BH&E) consolidated the Norfolk County and B&NYC into a single through line.

The BH&E built the Blackstone Viaduct just to the east in 1872, replacing a wooden trestle and an embankment, as part of an improvement program. The railroad completed the Air Line in 1873, placing Blackstone on a New York–Boston through route. The extension was costly, and the BH&E came out of bankruptcy in 1875 as the New York and New England Railroad (NY&NE). The P&W was leased by the New York, Providence and Boston Railroad in 1892, and in turn by the New York, New Haven, and Hartford Railroad in 1895. The NY&NE was under control of the New Haven by 1895, and was leased in 1899 as its Midland Division.

Except for a short period in the 1870s, Blackstone generally did not have schedules suitable for Boston commuting. By the turn of the century, it was served by three daily Boston–Hartford round trips and 7–8 Providence–Worcester round trips. Some commuter service was extended to Blackstone in the 1930s, but this was reduced to two Blackstone–Boston round trips plus a Boston–Hartford round trip in 1940. A second long-distance train on the route stopping at Blackstone was added during World War II.

Providence–Worcester service via Blackstone was reduced to one daily round trip by 1935, briefly increased to four in 1953, then reverted to one until discontinued in 1960. Boston commuter service was increased to six daily round trips in 1952, but service west of Blackstone ended in 1955 after rains from Hurricane Diane washed out a bridge near Putnam, Connecticut. The Massachusetts Bay Transportation Authority (MBTA) was formed in August 1964 to subsidize Boston commuter service. Franklin agreed to subsidize its service, but Blackstone did not, so service was cut back to Franklin. The disused station was demolished in 1969.

After the collapse of the Blackstone River bridge to the east in 1968, New Haven successor Penn Central was allowed to abandon the Midland Division between Putnam, Connecticut and Franklin in 1969. Most of that section, except the Blackstone Viaduct, has been converted to the Southern New England Trunkline Trail, with the former Blackstone station site as a parking lot. The P&W became independent from Penn Central in 1973 and continues to operate freight service.

References

External links

Former railway stations in Massachusetts
Buildings and structures in Blackstone, Massachusetts
Former New York, New Haven and Hartford Railroad stations
Railway stations in the United States opened in 1847
Railway stations closed in 1966